= Cardamyle (Chios) =

Town of ancient Greece on Chios

Coordinates: 38°32′50″N 26°06′20″E

Cardamyle or Kardamyle (Ancient Greek: Καρδαμύλη) was a town of ancient Greece on the island of Chios, mentioned by Thucydides as the place where the Athenians landed to attack the people of Chios. The country round the town was fertile and well-adapted to the cultivation of the vine.

Its site is tentatively located near modern Marmaron.
